William de Brus may refer to:

 William de Brus, 3rd Lord of Annandale (died 1212)
 William de Brus (fl. 1294), Anglo-Scottish knight